Cicadulina storeyi is a species of true bug in the family Cicadellidae. It is a pest of millets.

References

Cicadellidae
Insect pests of millets